Malvar LRT station is a proposed station on the Manila LRT Line 1 under the North Extension Project. The station will be located on the intersection of Epifanio de los Santos Avenue and General Malvar Street in Bagong Barrio, Caloocan. Once built, it will serve passengers to LRT Line-1 from the North Luzon Expressway along with Balintawak station.

History
Originally, there were no plans for a station in Bagong Barrio in this extension project. In September 2008, Caloocan Mayor Enrico Echiverri urged a petition for an additional station to be constructed at the corner of EDSA and Malvar street in Bagong Barrio. Studies by Caloocan's City Planning and Development Department showed that the Monumento Terminal would be congested once the line extension project is completed. The studies estimated that around 500,000 commuters from the CAMANAVA (Caloocan-Malabon-Navotas-Valenzuela) area will benefit from the additional station. The study also added that the station would create economic opportunities for the Bagong Barrio area, as it is a priority development area.

On November 3, 2008, residents of Caloocan blocked a section of EDSA as they staged a rally in order to urge the national government to push through with the Bagong Barrio station proposal. The Light Rail Transit Authority announced afterwards that an additional station in Bagong Barrio is not viable. A previous study performed by the LRTA revealed that should the station be built, it will lose 200 million pesos a year. In addition, it would also involve a time-consuming and costly redesign of the project. The Caloocan city government later declared that it would not release the necessary permits for construction in the Caloocan area should the Bagong Barrio Station proposal be rejected. In January 2009, the National Government approved the proposal of the Caloocan government for the additional station.

Current status
In a project update, the LRTA has designated the Bagong Barrio station as Malvar station. The feasibility study for the station was concluded on 22 December 2010. However, bidding for the station is yet to be scheduled. The station was included in the separate package that included the North Avenue station.

The station construction is currently shelved and no further plans to continue construction have been announced.

See also
List of rail transit stations in Metro Manila
Manila Light Rail Transit System

References

Manila Light Rail Transit System stations
Buildings and structures in Caloocan
Proposed railway stations in the Philippines